The  was an electric multiple unit (EMU) train type for local services operated by Chichibu Railway in Japan from 1979 to 1990.

Formations

Cars DeHa 806 and KuHa 856 were used as sources of spare parts and were scrapped without entering service.

History
Nine 2-car trains were converted in 1979 from former Odakyu 1800 series commuter EMUs. The trains were replaced by 1000 series EMUs from 1989 and withdrawn by 1990.

Preservation
As of December 2018, DeHa 801 remains at a farmhouse near Mount Akagi, Shibukawa city, Gunma.

References

Electric multiple units of Japan
Train-related introductions in 1979
Chichibu Railway
1500 V DC multiple units of Japan